2212 Hephaistos (1978 SB) is an Apollo asteroid and a NEO discovered on 27 September 1978 by L. I. Chernykh at the Crimean Astrophysical Observatory. It is named after the Greek god Hephaestus. It is the largest member of the Hephaistos asteroid group. It makes close approaches to all of the inner planets and will pass  from Mercury on 2032-Sep-16.

Other potential members of the Hephaistos group include (85182) 1991 AQ, 4486 Mithra, and D/1766 G1 (Helfenzrieder).

References

External links 
 
 
 

002212
Discoveries by Lyudmila Chernykh
Named minor planets
002212
19780927